Hexatriacontylic acid, or hexatriacontanoic acid is a 36-carbon-long carboxylic acid and saturated fatty acid.

See also
List of saturated fatty acids
Very long chain fatty acid
List of carboxylic acids

References

External links
Hexatriacontanoic acid at the Nature Lipidomics Gateway

Fatty acids
Alkanoic acids